Ostrinia obumbratalis, the smartweed borer, is a moth in the family Crambidae. It was described by Julius Lederer in 1863. It is found in North America, where it has been recorded from New Brunswick and Manitoba to Louisiana and Florida.

The larvae feed on various plants, including Polygonum, Ambrosia, Xanthium and Eupatorium species, as well as Zea mays.

References

Moths described in 1863
Pyraustinae